MacLaine or Maclaine (Gaelic: Mac Gill-Eain) is a surname of Scottish origin. It  may refer to:
Persons
Angus Gillean Mathew Maclaine, Younger of Lochbuie, Tannist to Lorne, 26th of Lochbuie
Christopher Maclaine (1923–1975), American poet and filmmaker
Gillean Maclaine (1921–1970), Scottish chief of Clan Maclaine of Lochbuie
James MacLaine (1724–1750), Irish highwayman
Lorne Maclaine (contemporary), Scottish chief of Clan Maclaine of Lochbuie, son of Gillean
Mark Maclaine (producer) (contemporary), English musician
Shirley MacLaine (born 1934), American actress

Scottish clan
Clan Maclaine of Lochbuie

Fictional persons
Jake Maclaine, character from the American soap opera The Bold and the Beautiful
Mark Maclaine (The Bold and the Beautiful), character from the American soap opera The Bold and the Beautiful

See also
 Clan Maclean
McLaine
McClain (disambiguation)
MacLean (disambiguation)
McLane (disambiguation)